Ron Smith (born 1949) is an American poet and the first writer-in-residence at St. Christopher's School in Richmond, Virginia.

He is the author of Running Again in Hollywood Cemetery, Moon Road, Its Ghostly Workshop, and The Humility of the Brutes. In 2005, he was selected, along with Elizabeth Seydel Morgan, as an inaugural winner of the Carole Weinstein Poetry Prize, "which is awarded each year to a poet with strong connections to the Commonwealth of Virginia." He serves as a curator for the prize along with Morgan, David Wojahn, and Don Selby.

Smith's poems have appeared in periodicals, including The Nation, Kenyon Review, New England Review, and in anthologies from Wesleyan University Press, Time-Life Books, University of Virginia Press, University of Georgia Press, and University of Illinois Press.

His essay-reviews have appeared in The Kenyon Review and other magazines and reference works, most recently in The Georgia Review, Blackbird: an online journal of literature and the arts, and H-Arete. He is a regular poetry reviewer for The Richmond Times-Dispatch.

Smith is a former president of the Poetry Society of Virginia, and is a trustee for the Edgar Allan Poe Museum. He sits on the board of directors for James River Writers.

From 2014 to 2016, he was Poet Laureate of Virginia.

Life
Born in Savannah, Georgia, Smith moved to Richmond, Virginia, to play college football. He holds degrees (B.A., M.A., M.H., M.F.A.) from the University of Richmond and Virginia Commonwealth University in philosophy, English, general humanities, and creative writing. He studied creative writing at Bennington College in Vermont, British drama at Worcester College, Oxford University, and Renaissance and modern culture and literature at the Ezra Pound Center for Literature in Meran, Italy.

He teaches creative writing (poetry, fiction, drama), twentieth-century American poetry, and has taught the life and works of Edgar Allan Poe at Mary Washington College, Virginia Commonwealth University, and the University of Richmond.

Ron Smith is the Writer in Residence at St. Christopher's School.

Works

Poetry books
 1988: Running Again in Hollywood Cemetery, called "a close second" by Margaret Atwood, judge for the National Poetry Series Open Competition; also a runner-up for the Samuel French Morse Prize; title poem awarded Southern Poetry Review's Guy Owen Award by judge Linda Pastanlater; published by University Presses of Florida; 
 2007: Moon Road: Poems 1986-2005, Louisiana State University Press, 72 pp, 
 2013: Its Ghostly Workshop, Louisiana State University Press, 
 2017: The Humility of the Brutes, Louisiana State University Press,

Other poetry
His 18-poem sequence "To Ithaca" appeared in the Summer 2002 issue of The Georgia Review.

Awards and recognitions
His awards and honors include:

 Poet Laureate of Virginia, 2014–16
 Theodore Roethke Poetry Prize from Poetry Northwest
 Guy Owen Poetry Prize
 Virginia Center for the Creative Arts Fellowship

Notes

External links

Poem: "Via Appia"
Poems: "Striking Out My Son in the Father-Son Game", "Leaving Forever", "Objectivity", "In the Old City"
Essay-review in The George Review, Winter 2004, reprinted in Poetry Daily: Old New Critics
Poems: "Coaching Pitchers" and "Double"
Poem: "Edward Teller's Leg"
Poem: "Campidoglio"
Poem in Plume, "κάθαρσης"
Essay-review from The Georgia Review, "Old New Critics"
Two poems set in the city of Rome
Poem in Ascent, set in New Orleans
Review of Ron Smith's Its Ghostly Workshop
Its Ghostly Workshop

American male poets
Poets Laureate of Virginia
University of Richmond alumni
Virginia Commonwealth University alumni
Writers from Richmond, Virginia
Living people
University of Richmond faculty
Virginia Commonwealth University faculty
University of Mary Washington faculty
1949 births